The Gathas are 17 Avestan hymns traditionally believed to have been composed by the prophet Zarathushtra (Zoroaster). They form the core of the Zoroastrian liturgy (the Yasna). They are arranged in five different modes or metres.

The Avestan term  (𐬔𐬁𐬚𐬁 "hymn", but also "mode, metre") is cognate with Sanskrit gāthā (गाथा), both from the Proto-Indo-Iranian word *gaHtʰáH, from the root *gaH- "to sing".

Structure and organization 

The Gathas are in verse, metrical in the nature of ancient Iranian religious poetry, that is extremely terse.

The 17 hymns of the Gathas consist of 238 stanzas, of about 1300 lines or 6000 words in total. They were later incorporated into the 72-chapter Yasna (chapter: ha or had, from the Avestan ha'iti, 'cut'), that in turn is the primary liturgical collection of texts within the greater compendium of the Avesta. The 17 hymns are identified by their chapter numbers in the Yasna, and are divided into five major sections:

With the exception of Ahunavaiti Gatha, that is named after the Ahuna Vairya prayer (Yasna 27, not in the Gathas), the names of the Gathas reflect the first word(s) of the first hymn within them. The meter of the hymns is historically related to the Vedic tristubh-jagati family of meters. Hymns of these meters are recited, not sung.

The sequential order of the Gathas is structurally interrupted by the Yasna Haptanghaiti ("seven-chapter Yasna", chapters 35–41, linguistically as old as the Gathas but in prose) and by two other minor hymns at Yasna 42 and 52.

Language 
The language of the Gathas, Gathic or Old Avestan, belongs to the old Iranian language group that is a sub-group of Eastern families of the Indo-European languages. The dependency on Vedic Sanskrit is a significant weakness in the interpretation of the Gathas, as the two languages, though from a common origin, had developed independently. Sassanid era translations and commentaries (the Zend) have been used to interpret the Gathas, but by the 3rd century the Avestan language was virtually extinct, and a dependency on the medieval texts is often discouraged as the commentaries are frequently conjectural. While some scholars argue that an interpretation using younger texts is inadvisable (Geldner, Humbach), others argue that such a view is excessively skeptical (Spiegel, Darmesteter). The risks of misinterpretation are real, but lacking alternates, such dependencies are perhaps necessary.

"The Middle Persian translation seldom offers an appropriate point of departure for a detailed scholarly approach to the Gathas, but an intensive comparison of its single lines and their respective glosses with their Gathic originals usually reveals the train of thought of the translator. This obviously reflects the Gatha interpretation by the priests of the Sasanian period, the general view of which is closer to the original than what is sometimes taught about the Gathas in our time."

The problems that face a translator of the Avestan Gathas are significant: "No one who has ever read a stanza of [the Gathas] in the original will be under any illusions as to the labour that underlies the effort [of translating the hymns]. The most abstract and perplexing thought, veiled further by archaic language, only half understood by later students of the seer's own race and tongue, tends to make the Gathas the hardest problem to be attempted by those who would investigate the literary monuments."

Content 
Some of the verses of the Gathas are directly addressed to the Omniscient Creator Ahura Mazda. These verses, devotional in character, expound on the divine essences of truth (Asha), the good-mind (Vohu Manah), and the spirit of righteousness. Some other verses are addressed to the public that may have come to hear the prophet, and in these verses, he exhorts his audience to live a life as Ahura Mazda has directed, and pleads to Ahura Mazda to intervene on their behalf.

Other verses, from which some aspects of Zoroaster's life have been inferred, are semi-(auto)biographical, but all revolve around Zarathustra's mission to promote his view of the Truth (again Asha). For instance, some of the passages describe Zarathustra's first attempts to promote the teachings of Ahura Mazda, and the subsequent rejection by his kinsmen. This and other rejection led him to have doubts about his message, and in the Gathas he asked for assurance from Ahura Mazda, and requests repudiation of his opponents.

Notes

Further reading 

 

Selected translations available online:
 Bartholomae's translations ("Die Gatha's des Awesta", 1905) were re-translated into English by Taraporewala. The raw texts, sans commentary or introduction, are available online
 The PDF version of The Divine Songs of Zarathushtra by Irach J. S. Taraporewala is published by FEZANA online
 Complete text of the book including introduction and a plain English synopsis of each verse is available online

External links 

Avesta. The Hymns of Zarathustra

Zoroastrian texts
Avesta
Sources of ancient Iranian religion
Hymns